Marie Theres Fögen (10 October 1946 in Lüdinghausen, West Germany – 18 January 2008 in Zürich, Switzerland) was a German jurist and historian. She taught law at the University of Zurich and Harvard University (as visiting professor) and was director of the Max Planck Institute for European History of Law in Frankfurt am Main.

References

1946 births
2008 deaths
Harvard University staff
Jurists from North Rhine-Westphalia
Academic staff of the University of Zurich
20th-century German historians
German women historians
20th-century German women writers
People from Lüdinghausen
Max Planck Institute directors